In European Christianity, the divine right of kings, divine right, or God's mandation is a political and religious doctrine of political legitimacy of a monarchy. It stems from a specific metaphysical framework in which a monarch is, before birth, pre-ordained to inherit the crown, chosen by God and in the image of God. According to this theory of political legitimacy, the subjects of the crown have actively (and not merely passively) turned over the metaphysical selection of the king's soul – which will inhabit the body and rule them – to God. In this way, the "divine right" originates as a metaphysical act of humility and/or submission towards God. Divine right has been a key element of the legitimisation of many absolute monarchies.

Significantly, the doctrine asserts that a monarch is not accountable to any earthly authority (such as a parliament) because their right to rule is derived from divine authority. Thus, the monarch is not subject to the will of the people, of the aristocracy, or of any other estate of the realm. It follows that only divine authority can judge a monarch, and that any attempt to depose, dethrone or restrict their powers runs contrary to God's will and may constitute a sacrilegious act. It is often expressed in the phrase by the Grace of God, Derived from the Latin title "Dei Gratia" ("Dei Gratia Regina", by the grace of God, Queen. "Dei Gratia Rex", by the grace of God, King) which has historically been attached to the titles of certain reigning monarchs. Note, however, that such accountability only to God does not per-se make the monarch a sacred king.

Historically, many notions of rights have been authoritarian and hierarchical, with different people granted different rights and some having more rights than others. For instance, the right of a father to receive respect from his son did not indicate a right for the son to receive a return from that respect. Analogously, the divine right of kings, which permitted absolute power over subjects, provided few rights for the subjects themselves.  

In contrast, conceptions of rights developed during the Age of Enlightenment – for example during the American and French Revolutions – often emphasised liberty and equality as being among the most important of rights.

Pre-Christian conceptions

Zoroastrianism (Iranian world) 

Khvarenah (also spelled khwarenah or xwarra(h):) is an Iranian and Zoroastrian concept, which literally means glory, about divine right of the kings. This may stem from early Mesopotamian culture, where kings were often regarded as deities after their death. Shulgi of Ur was among the first Mesopotamian rulers to declare himself to be divine. In the Iranian view, kings would never rule, unless Khvarenah is with them, and they will never fall unless Khvarenah leaves them. For example, according to the Kar-namag of Ardashir, when Ardashir I of Persia and Artabanus V of Parthia fought for the throne of Iran, on the road Artabanus and his contingent are overtaken by an enormous ram, which is also following Ardashir. Artabanus's religious advisors explain to him that the ram is the manifestation of the khwarrah of the ancient Iranian kings, which is leaving Artabanus to join Ardashir.

Roman Empire 
The Imperial cult of ancient Rome identified Roman emperors and some members of their families with the "divinely sanctioned" authority (auctoritas) of the Roman State. The official offer of cultus to a living emperor acknowledged his office and rule as divinely approved and constitutional: his Principate should therefore demonstrate pious respect for traditional Republican deities and mores. Many of the rites, practices and status distinctions that characterized the cult to emperors were perpetuated in the theology and politics of the Christianised Empire.

Judaism 
While the earliest references to kingship in Israel proclaim that "14 "When you come to the land that the Lord your God is giving you, and you possess it and dwell in it and then say, 'I will set a king over me, like all the nations that are around me,' 15 you may indeed set a king over you whom the Lord your God will choose. One from among your brothers you shall set as king over you. You may not put a foreigner over you, who is not your brother." (Deut 17:14-15), significant debate on the legitimacy of kingship has persisted in Rabbinical judaism until Maimonides, though many mainstream currents continue to reject the notion. The controversy is highlighted by the instructions to the Israelites in the above-quoted passage, as well as the passages in 1 Samuel 8 and 12, concerning the dispute over kingship; and Perashat Shoftim.  It is from 1 Samuel 8 that the Jews receive mishpat ha-melech, the ius regium, or the law of kingship, and from this passage that Maimonides finally concludes that Judaism supports the institution of monarchy, stating that the Israelites had been given three commandments upon entering the land of Israel - to designate a king for themselves, to wipe out the memory of Amalek, and to build the Temple.  The debate has primarily centred around the problem of being told to "designate" a king, which some rabbinical sources have argued is an invocation against a divine right of kings, and a call to elect a leader, in opposition to a notion of a divine right.  Other rabbinical arguments have put forward an idea that it is through the collective decision of the people that God's will is made manifest, and that the king does therefore have a divine right - once appointed by the nation, he is God's emissary. 

Jewish law requires one to recite a special blessing upon seeing a monarch: "Blessed are You, L‑rd our G‑d, King of the universe, Who has given from His glory to flesh and blood".

Christian conceptions

During early and middle ages 

Outside of Christianity, especially in religious societies (such as Muslim and Jewish societies), kings were often seen as ruling with the backing of heavenly powers or perhaps even as divine beings themselves. However, the Christian notion of a divine right of kings is traced to a story found in 1 Samuel, where the prophet Samuel anoints Saul and then David as Messiah ("anointed one")—king over Israel. In the Jewish traditions, the lack of a divine leadership represented by an anointed king [beginning shortly after the death of Joshua] left the people of Israel vulnerable, and the promise of the "promised land" was not fully fulfilled until a king was anointed by a prophet on behalf of God.

The effect of anointing was seen to be that the monarch became inviolable, so that even when Saul sought to kill David, David would not raise his hand against him because "he was the Lord's anointed". Raising a hand to a king was therefore considered to be as sacrilegious as raising a hand against God, and stood on equal footing as blasphemy. In essence, the king stood in place of God and was never to be challenged "without the challenger being accused of blasphemy" - except by a prophet, which under Christianity was replaced by the church. 

Although the later Roman Empire had developed the European concept of a divine regent in Late Antiquity, Adomnan of Iona provides one of the earliest written examples of a Western medieval concept of kings ruling with divine right. He wrote of the Irish King Diarmait mac Cerbaill's assassination and claimed that divine punishment fell on his assassin for the act of violating the monarch. Adomnan also recorded a story about Saint Columba supposedly being visited by an angel carrying a glass book, who told him to ordain Aedan mac Gabrain as King of Dal Riata. Columba initially refused, and the angel answered by whipping him and demanding that he perform the ordination because God had commanded it. The same angel visited Columba on three successive nights. Columba finally agreed, and Aedan came to receive ordination. At the ordination, Columba told Aedan that so long as he obeyed God's laws, then none of his enemies would prevail against him, but the moment he broke them, this protection would end, and the same whip with which Columba had been struck would be turned against the king. Adomnan's writings most likely influenced other Irish writers, who in turn influenced continental ideas as well. Pepin the Short's coronation may have also come from the same influence. The Byzantine Empire can be seen as the progenitor of this concept (which began with Constantine I). This in turn inspired the Carolingian dynasty and the Holy Roman Emperors, whose lasting impact on Western and Central Europe further inspired all subsequent Western ideas of kingship.

In the Middle Ages, the idea that God had granted earthly power to the monarch, just as he had given spiritual authority and power to the church, especially to the Pope, was already a well-known concept long before later writers coined the term "divine right of kings" and employed it as a theory in political science. For example, Richard I of England declared at his trial during the diet at Speyer in 1193: "I am born in a rank which recognizes no superior but God, to whom alone I am responsible for my actions", and it was Richard who first used the motto "Dieu et mon droit" ("God and my right") which is still the motto of the Monarch of the United Kingdom.

With the rise of nation-states and the Protestant Reformation in the late 16th century, the theory of divine right justified the king's absolute authority in both political and spiritual matters.  Henry VIII of England declared himself the Supreme Head of the Church of England, and exerted the power of the throne more than any of his predecessors.  As a political theory, it was further developed by James VI of Scotland (1567–1625), and came to the fore in England under his reign as James I of England (1603–1625). Louis XIV of France (1643–1715) strongly promoted the theory as well.

Scots texts of James VI of Scotland 

The Scots textbooks of the divine right of kings were written in 1597–1598 by James VI of Scotland. His Basilikon Doron, a manual on the powers of a king, was written to edify his four-year-old son Henry Frederick that a king "acknowledgeth himself ordained for his people, having received from God a burden of government, whereof he must be countable". He based his theories in part on his understanding of the Bible, as noted by the following quote from a speech to parliament delivered in 1610 as James I of England:

James's reference to "God's lieutenants" is apparently a reference to the text in Romans 13 where Paul refers to "God's ministers".

Western conceptions 

The conception of ordination brought with it largely unspoken parallels with the Anglican and Catholic priesthood, but the overriding metaphor in James VI's  'Basilikon Doron' was that of a father's relation to his children. "Just as no misconduct on the part of a father can free his children from obedience to the fifth commandment", James also had printed his Defense of the Right of Kings in the face of English theories of inalienable popular and clerical rights. The divine right of kings, or divine-right theory of kingship, is a political and religious doctrine of royal and political legitimacy. It asserts that a monarch is subject to no earthly authority, deriving his right to rule directly from the will of God. The king is thus not subject to the will of his people, the aristocracy, or any other estate of the realm, including (in the view of some, especially in Protestant countries) the church. A weaker or more moderate form of this political theory does hold, however, that the king is subject to the church and the pope, although completely irreproachable in other ways; but according to this doctrine in its strong form, only God can judge an unjust king. The doctrine implies that any attempt to depose the king or to restrict his powers runs contrary to the will of God and may constitute a sacrilegious act.

One passage in scripture supporting the idea of the divine right of kings was used by Martin Luther, when urging the secular authorities to crush the Peasant Rebellion of 1525 in Germany in his Against the Murderous, Thieving Hordes of Peasants, basing his argument on St. Paul's Epistle to the Romans.

It is related to the ancient Catholic philosophies regarding monarchy, in which the monarch is God's vicegerent upon the earth and therefore subject to no inferior power. However, in Roman Catholic jurisprudence, the monarch is always subject to natural and divine law, which are regarded as superior to the monarch. The possibility of monarchy declining morally, overturning natural law, and degenerating into a tyranny oppressive of the general welfare was answered theologically with the Catholic concept of the spiritual superiority of the Pope (there is no "Catholic concept of extra-legal tyrannicide", as some falsely suppose, the same being expressly condemned by St Thomas Aquinas in chapter 7 of his De Regno). Until the unification of Italy, the Holy See did, from the time Christianity became the Roman state religion, assert on that ground its primacy over secular princes; however this exercise of power never, even at its zenith, amounted to theocracy, even in jurisdictions where the Bishop of Rome was the temporal authority.

Catholic justification for the divine right of kings 

Catholic thought justified submission to the monarchy by reference to the following:
 The Old Testament, in which God chose kings to rule over Israel, beginning with Saul who was then rejected by God in favour of David, whose dynasty continued (at least in the southern kingdom) until the Babylonian captivity.
 The New Testament, in which the first pope, St. Peter, commands that all Christians shall honour the Roman Emperor, even though, at that time, he was still a pagan emperor. St. Paul agreed with St. Peter that subjects should be obedient to the powers that be because they are appointed by God, as he wrote in his Epistle to the Romans. Likewise, Jesus Christ proclaims in the Gospel of Matthew that one should "Render unto Caesar the things which are Caesar's"; that is at first, literally, the payment of taxes as binding those who use the imperial currency. Jesus told Pontius Pilate that his authority as Roman governor of Judaea came from heaven according to John 19:10–11.
 The endorsement by the popes and the church of the line of emperors beginning with the Emperors Constantine and Theodosius, later the Eastern Roman emperors, and finally the Western Roman emperor, Charlemagne and his successors, the Catholic Holy Roman Emperors.

The French Huguenot nobles and clergy, having rejected the pope and the Catholic Church, were left only with the supreme power of the king who, they taught, could not be gainsaid or judged by anyone. Since there was no longer the countervailing power of the papacy and since the Church of England was a creature of the state and had become subservient to it, this meant that there was nothing to regulate the powers of the king, and he became an absolute power. In theory, divine, natural, customary, and constitutional law still held sway over the king, but, absent a superior spiritual power, it was difficult to see how they could be enforced since the king could not be tried by any of his own courts.

Some of the symbolism within the coronation ceremony for British monarchs, in which they are anointed with holy oils by the Archbishop of Canterbury, thereby ordaining them to monarchy, perpetuates the ancient Roman Catholic monarchical ideas and ceremonial (although few Protestants realize this, the ceremony is nearly entirely based upon that of the Coronation of the Holy Roman Emperor). However, in the UK, the symbolism ends there since the real governing authority of the monarch was all but extinguished by the Whig revolution of 1688–89 (see Glorious Revolution). The king or queen of the United Kingdom is one of the last monarchs still to be crowned in the traditional Christian ceremonial, which in most other countries has been replaced by an inauguration or other declaration.

The concept of divine right incorporates, but exaggerates, the ancient Christian concept of "royal God-given rights", which teach that "the right to rule is anointed by God", although this idea is found in many other cultures, including Aryan and Egyptian traditions. In pagan religions, the king was often seen as a kind of god and so was an unchallengeable despot. The ancient Roman Catholic tradition overcame this idea with the doctrine of the two swords and so achieved, for the very first time, a balanced constitution for states. The advent of Protestantism saw something of a return to the idea of a mere unchallengeable despot.

Thomas Aquinas condoned extra-legal tyrannicide in the worst of circumstances:

On the other hand, Aquinas forbade the overthrow of any morally, Christianly and spiritually legitimate king by his subjects. The only human power capable of deposing the king was the pope. The reasoning was that if a subject may overthrow his superior for some bad law, who was to be the judge of whether the law was bad? If the subject could so judge his own superior, then all lawful superior authority could lawfully be overthrown by the arbitrary judgement of an inferior, and thus all law was under constant threat. Towards the end of the Middle Ages, many philosophers, such as Nicholas of Cusa and Francisco Suárez, propounded similar theories. The Church was the final guarantor that Christian kings would follow the laws and constitutional traditions of their ancestors and the laws of God and of justice. Similarly, the Chinese concept of Mandate of Heaven required that the emperor properly carry out the proper rituals and consult his ministers; however, this concept made it extremely difficult to undo any acts carried out by an ancestor.

The French prelate Jacques-Bénigne Bossuet made a classic statement of the doctrine of divine right in a sermon preached before King Louis XIV:

Divine right and Protestantism 
Before the Reformation the anointed king was, within his realm, the accredited vicar of God for secular purposes (see the Investiture Controversy); after the Reformation he (or she if queen regnant) became this in Protestant states for religious purposes also.

In England, it is not without significance that the sacerdotal vestments, generally discarded by the clergy – dalmatic, alb and stole – continued to be among the insignia of the sovereign (see Coronation of the British monarch). Moreover, this sacrosanct character he acquired not by virtue of his "sacring", but by hereditary right; the coronation, anointing and vesting were but the outward and visible symbol of a divine grace adherent in the sovereign by virtue of his title. Even Roman Catholic monarchs, like Louis XIV, would never have admitted that their coronation by the archbishop constituted any part of their title to reign; it was no more than the consecration of their title.

In England the doctrine of the divine right of kings was developed to its most extreme logical conclusions during the political controversies of the 17th century; its most famous exponent was Sir Robert Filmer. It was the main issue to be decided by the English Civil War, the Royalists holding that "all Christian kings, princes and governors" derive their authority direct from God, the Parliamentarians that this authority is the outcome of a contract, actual or implied, between sovereign and people.

In one case the king's power would be unlimited, according to Louis XIV's famous saying: "L' état, c'est moi!", or limited only by his own free act; in the other his actions would be governed by the advice and consent of the people, to whom he would be ultimately responsible. The victory of this latter principle was proclaimed to all the world by the execution of Charles I. The doctrine of divine right, indeed, for a while drew nourishment from the blood of the royal "martyr"; it was the guiding principle of the Anglican Church of the Restoration; but it suffered a rude blow when James II of England made it impossible for the clergy to obey both their conscience and their king. The Glorious Revolution of 1688 made an end of it as a great political force. This has led to the constitutional development of the Crown in Britain, as held by descent modified and modifiable by parliamentary action.

Opposition to the divine right of kings 

In the sixteenth century, both Catholic and Protestant political thinkers alike began to question the idea of a monarch's "divine right".

The Spanish Catholic historian Juan de Mariana put forward the argument in his book De rege et regis institutione (1598) that since society was formed by a "pact" among all its members, "there can be no doubt that they are able to call a king to account". Mariana thus challenged divine right theories by stating in certain circumstances, tyrannicide could be justified. Cardinal Robert Bellarmine also "did not believe that the institute of monarchy had any divine sanction" and shared Mariana's belief that there were times where Catholics could lawfully remove a monarch.

Among groups of English Protestant exiles fleeing from Queen Mary I, some of the earliest anti-monarchist publications emerged. "Weaned off uncritical royalism by the actions of Queen Mary ... The political thinking of men like Ponet, Knox, Goodman and Hales."

In 1553, Mary I, a Roman Catholic, succeeded her Protestant half-brother, Edward VI, to the English throne. Mary set about trying to restore Roman Catholicism by making sure that: Edward's religious laws were abolished in the Statute of Repeal Act (1553); the Protestant religious laws passed in the time of Henry VIII were repealed; and the Revival of the Heresy Acts were passed in 1554. The Marian Persecutions began soon afterwards. In January 1555, the first of nearly 300 Protestants were burnt at the stake under "Bloody Mary". When Thomas Wyatt the Younger instigated what became known as Wyatt's rebellion, John Ponet, the highest-ranking ecclesiastic among the exiles, allegedly participated in the uprising. He escaped to Strasbourg after the Rebellion's defeat and, the following year, he published A Shorte Treatise of Politike Power, in which he put forward a theory of justified opposition to secular rulers.

Ponet's pamphlet was republished on the eve of King Charles I's execution.

According to U.S. President John Adams, Ponet's work contained "all the essential principles of liberty, which were afterward dilated on by Sidney and Locke", including the idea of a three-branched government.

Over time, opposition to the divine right of kings came from a number of sources, including poet John Milton in his pamphlet The Tenure of Kings and Magistrates, and Thomas Paine in his pamphlet Common Sense. By 1700 an Anglican 
Archbishop  was prepared to  assert  that  Kings hold their Crowns  by 
law alone, and  the  law  may forfeit  them. Probably the two most famous declarations of a right to revolution against tyranny in the English language are John Locke's Essay concerning The True Original, Extent, and End of Civil-Government and Thomas Jefferson's formulation in the United States Declaration of Independence that "all men are created equal".

Related concepts in other religions
 Mandate of Heaven and monarch as the Son of Heaven - Sinosphere
 Madkhalism - Islam
 Guardianship of the Islamic Jurist
 Monarchs who are also deities:
 God emperors
 God kings
 Sacred kings - the occupant of the monarchy gains religious significance or has support from a deity
 Cakravartin - South Asia

See also
 Absolute monarchy
 Ancien Régime - the government in France justified by the divine right of kings
 Caliphate
 Church and state in medieval Europe
 Cuius regio, eius religio - the European idea that the religion of the people follows the religion of the ruler
 Exclusive right
 Royal prerogative
 Vindiciae contra tyrannos - a tract opposing the divine right of kings

Notes

References

Further reading

External links

 

Monarchy
Political philosophy
Political history of the Ancien Régime
Early Modern period
Deified people
Sovereignty
Religion and politics
Religious ethics
Hereditary monarchy